Cottonwood Airport is a public use airport located  northwest of Rockford, Illinois. The airport is privately owned.

The airport is home to EAA Chapter 22. The airport hosts year-round events like fly-ins and events around the annual AirVenture event in Oshkosh, Wisconsin.

History
In its early years, the airport was mostly used for flight training. As the airport changed hands between 1946 and 1977, its status changed multiple times from non-use to restricted to public use.

The airport kept changing ownership until 1985, when The Cottonwood Corporation was formed in order to buy the airport and keep it from closing permanently. A set number of stocks in the airport were sold to pay the down payment, and additional stockholders have been brought in since to help pay for airport maintenance.

Facilities and aircraft
The airport does not have an FBO, fuel, or any flying clubs.

Cottonwood Airport has 25 aircraft operations per day, or just over 9000 per year. All this traffic is general aviation. For the same time period, there are 44 aircraft based on the field: 40 single-engine airplanes, two helicopters, and two ultralights.

Accidents and incidents
On August 14, 2020, an experimental plane crashed during takeoff from Cottonwood. The airplane overran the runway and onto a nearby road, striking a car.

References 

Airports in Illinois